Azorhizobium oxalatiphilum is a Gram-negative, motile, non-spore-forming bacteria from the family Xanthobacteraceae which has been isolated from petioles of the plant Rumex in Muğla in Turkey. Azorhizobium oxalatiphilum has the ability to utilizes oxalic acid.

References

Further reading

External links
Type strain of Azorhizobium oxalatiphilum at BacDive -  the Bacterial Diversity Metadatabase

Hyphomicrobiales
Bacteria described in 2013